Thetakudi Harihara Vinayakram (born 11 August 1942), also known as Vikku Vinayakram, is an Indian percussionist. He is also known as the God of ghatam. He plays Carnatic music with the ghatam, an earthen pot, and is credited with popularising the ghatam.

He was awarded the Padma Shri, given by Government of India in 2002, and later the 2012 Sangeet Natak Akademi Fellowship, the highest honour in the performing arts conferred by the Sangeet Natak Akademi, India's National Academy for Music, Dance and Drama. In 2014 he was awarded the Padma Bhushan.

Early life
Vinayakram was born to Kalaimaamani T. R. Harihara Sharma, a musician and teacher. He took up playing at a very young age.

Career
Vinayakram's concert career began at the age of 13. His first performance was on 5 March 1957 at the Rama Navami festival in Thoothukudi. While proceeding for the arangetram the tuned ghatam instrument was broken by a child named Ganesh, which by itself had been a good omen for his bright career. where he accompanied V.V.Sadagopan. He was soon accompanying many vocalists in Carnatic music at the time, including Chembai Vaidyanatha Bhagavatar, M K Thiagaraja Bagavathar, Dr Sirkazhi S.Govindarajan, Mangalampalli Balamuralikrishna, G. N. Balasubramaniam, Madurai Mani Iyer, Semmangudi Srinivasa Iyer, M. S. Subbulakshmi and Maharajapuram Santhanam. His brother, T. H. Subhash Chandran, also excelled in the field. The Ghatam rose to fame as a percussion instrument that required nimble fingers and strong stomach muscles to control the mouth of the pot.

Vinayakram's tryst with the international music platform came in the early 1970s when he joined Shakti to play along with John McLaughlin and Zakir Hussain.

He has also performed at Basant Utsav, the annual fund raiser for the Banyan.

Vinayakram is Principal of Sri Jaya Ganesh Tala Vadya Vidyalaya in Chennai, India – the academy established by his late father and teacher in 1958. It continues to produce new stars of Carnatic percussion. Vinayakram's son V. Selvaganesh is a percussionist, especially after tours with John McLaughlin's group, Remember Shakti.

Discography
 A Handful of Beauty (Shakti Album) (1976)
 Natural Elements (1977)
Planet Drum (1991) – Mickey Hart
Straight to your Heart (1990) Nadaka & Ganesh Rajagopalan
Mysterium Tremendum (2012) – Mickey Hart Band

Awards

Vinayakram was nominated for the 1996 Grammy Awards for Best World Music Album for his participation in 'Raga Aberi' along with L. Shankar on the ten string double violin and Zakir Hussain on the tabla (the piece is set in the tala cycle of 4¾ beats). The Indian Government decorated him with the Padma Shri Award in 2002.

Finally, he was awarded the 2012 Sangeet Natak Akademi Fellowship (Akademi Ratna), the highest award in performing arts in India, given by Sangeet Natak Akademi, India's National Academy for Music, Dance and Drama. In 2014 he was awarded the Padma Bhushan by Government of India

Vinayakram was awarded Dr.M.S.Subbulakshmi Centenary award, on 16 September 2016.

References

External links

 
 Vikku Vinayakram at Last.fm

1944 births
Living people
Ghatam players
Indian percussionists
Musicians from Chennai
Planet Drum members
Morsing players
Recipients of the Sangeet Natak Akademi Fellowship
Recipients of the Padma Shri in arts
Recipients of the Padma Bhushan in arts
20th-century Indian musicians
Shakti (band) members
Remember Shakti members
Recipients of the Sangeet Natak Akademi Award